Verrières-du-Grosbois is a former commune in the Doubs department in the Bourgogne-Franche-Comté region in eastern France. On 1 January 2017, it was merged into the commune Étalans.

Population

See also
Communes of the Doubs department

References

Former communes of Doubs